Doctor Stranger is a 2014 South Korean television series starring Lee Jong-suk, Jin Se-yeon, Park Hae-jin and Kang So-Ra. It aired on SBS from May 5 to July 8, 2014 on Mondays and Tuesdays at 21:55 KST (UTC+9) for 20 episodes.

Synopsis
As a child, Park Hoon (Lee Jong-suk) and his father Park Cheol (Kim Sang-joong) were tricked and sent to North Korea. After being sent to North Korea, Park Hoon and his father were denied access to go back to South Korea. In North Korea, Park Hoon was trained to become a doctor by his father who was already a famous doctor. He became a genius cardiothoracic surgeon after attending medical school in North Korea. There, he fell deeply in love with Song Jae-hee (Jin Se-yeon). After Park Hoon's father died, he tried to flee to South Korea with Jae-hee, but lost contact with her in the end. Park Hoon was able to flee to South Korea alone.

In South Korea, Park Hoon begins to work as doctor in a top hospital Myungwoo University Hospital. Meanwhile, he found a girl that looks exactly like Jae-hee, Doctor Han Seung-hee, who claims not to know Park Hoon.

Cast

Main
Lee Jong-suk as Park Hoon 박훈 
 Goo Seung-hyun as young Park Hoon
A South Korean who was raised in North Korea after his father was conned into going over to North. He trained to be a genius doctor in North Korea and later defects to South Korea in a bid to live a better life with his lover.

Jin Se-yeon as Song Jae-hee 송재희/Han Seung-hee한승희
 Seo Ji-hee as young Song Jae-hee
Jae-hee is Park Hoon's soul mate who was separated from him while they were escaping from North Korea; Seung-hee is a North Korean woman and is a specialist in oriental medicine anesthesia.
Park Hae-jin as Han Jae-joon 한재준/ Lee Sung-hoon 이성훈 
 Kim Ji-hoon as young Lee Sung-hoon
A genius who graduated from Harvard and became a doctor to take revenge on Myungwoo Hospital, as Park Hoon's rival.
Kang So-ra  as  Oh Soo-hyun 오수현
 Shin Soo-yeon as young Oh Soo-hyun
Daughter of the chairman of Myungwoo Hospital, a cardiothoracic surgeon

Supporting
Park Hae-joon as Cha Jin-soo (North Korean agent)
Chun Ho-jin as Prime Minister Jang Seok-joo
Jeon Gook-hwan as Oh Joon-gyu (Soo-hyun's father and chairman of the Myungwoo Hospital)
Choi Jung-woo as Moon Hyung-wook
Nam Myung-ryul as Choi Byeong-cheol
Yoon Bo-ra as Lee Chang-yi
Kim Sang-ho as Yang Jeong-han
Hwang Dong-joo as Geum Bong-hyun
Kang Tae-hwan as Oh Sang-jin
Lee Jae Won as Kim Chi-gyu
Kim Bo-mi as Kim Ah-young (Chi-gyu's younger sister)
Uhm Soo-jung as Min Soo-ji
Han Eun-sun as Eun Min-se
Jung In-gi as Kim Tae-sool
Kim Ji-eun as Joon-gyu's secretary
Kim Yong-gun as President Hong Chan-sang
Kim Ji-young as Jeong-min
Kim Sang-joong as Park Cheol (Park Hoon's father)
Zhang Liang as Sean Zhang (Jae-joon's friend)
Jung Hye-in as Nurse

Original soundtrack

Part 1

Part 2

Part 3

Part 4

Part 5

Part 6

Production and broadcast
Director Jin Hyuk previously directed Brilliant Legacy (2009), City Hunter (2011), Master's Sun (2013). Co-screenwriter Park Jin-woo previously wrote Conspiracy in the Court (2007) and The Kingdom of the Winds (2008).

In China, the online streaming rights for drama were sold for $80,000 per episode and the drama was made available for online streaming on both Youku and Tudou where it received 330 million and 50 million views, respectively. As of July 7, 2014 it has been streamed close to 400 million times. Due to the drama's success in China there are currently plans to edit the drama into a film and release it theatrically exclusively in China with an alternate ending. According to the website DailyNK, which reports on North Korea-related issues, the drama was highly popular among North Korean youth who would obtain it illegally at the jangmadang (markets).

Ratings

Awards and nominations

References

External links
 

2014 South Korean television series debuts
2014 South Korean television series endings
Seoul Broadcasting System television dramas
Korean-language television shows
South Korean medical television series
South Korean romance television series